Wellsboro Historic District, is a national historic district in Wellsboro, Tioga County, Pennsylvania, United States. It includes 531 contributing buildings, three contributing sites, and four contributing objects. It is a  district that is a mixed use commercial / residential / institutional district.  The historic structures date from 1835 to the 1950s and include the Tioga County Court House (1835), Arcadia Theater (1924), First Presbyterian Church (1894), Green Free Library, Penn-Wells Hotel (c. 1910), First Presbyterian Church (1894), St. Paul's Episcopal Church (1899), United Methodist Church of Wellsboro (1905), and Wellsboro Diner (1939).  Three previously listed properties are also included: the Robinson House, Jesse Robinson House, and Wellsboro Armory.

It was listed on the National Register of Historic Places in 2005.

See also 
 National Register of Historic Places listings in Tioga County, Pennsylvania

Gallery

References

External links
 [ Historic district General Map]
 [ Historic district Detail Map]

Historic districts on the National Register of Historic Places in Pennsylvania
Geography of Tioga County, Pennsylvania
National Register of Historic Places in Tioga County, Pennsylvania